Olney Springs is a Statutory Town in Crowley County, Colorado, United States. The population was 345 at the 2010 census.

Description
A post office called Olney Springs has been in operation since 1909. The town was named after one Mr. Olney, a railroad official.

Geography
Olney Springs is located in southwestern Crowley County at  (38.165844, -103.945723). Colorado State Highway 96 leads east  to Ordway, the county seat, and west  to Pueblo.

Slightly west of the town is the Crowley County Correctional Facility, owned by the Corrections Corporation of America. It has 1,794 prisoners from various states. Built as a speculative venture in 1998, it had a massive riot in 1999 when operated by the now-defunct Community Services Corporation. The builder, Dominion Ventures, took over its management, and in January 2003 ownership and operation transferred to CCA. Another devastating riot took place on July 20, 2004, once again requiring massive intervention by local and state law enforcement and correctional personnel.

Demographics

As of the census of 2000, there were 389 people, 145 households, and 99 families residing in the town. The racial makeup of the town was 81.75% White, 0.51% African American, 2.57% Native American, 12.60% from other races, and 2.57% from two or more races. Hispanic or Latino of any race were 21.85% of the population.

There were 145 households, out of which 35.9% had children under the age of 18 living with them, 50.3% were married couples living together, 13.1% had a female householder with no husband present, and 31.7% were non-families. 26.9% of all households were made up of individuals, and 14.5% had someone living alone who was 65 years of age or older. The average household size was 2.68 and the average family size was 3.31.

In the town, the population was spread out, with 34.7% under the age of 18, 4.9% from 18 to 24, 26.0% from 25 to 44, 19.0% from 45 to 64, and 15.4% who were 65 years of age or older. The median age was 33 years. For every 100 females, there were 96.5 males. For every 100 females age 18 and over, there were 92.4 males.

The median income for a household in the town was $25,536, and the median income for a family was $30,000. Males had a median income of $18,958 versus $17,222 for females. The per capita income for the town was $13,554. About 9.4% of families and 13.9% of the population were below the poverty line, including 16.0% of those under age 18 and 22.6% of those age 65 or over.

See also

 List of municipalities in Colorado

References

External links

 Olney Springs page at Crowleycounty.net
 CDOT map of the Town of Olney Springs

Towns in Crowley County, Colorado
Towns in Colorado